The Year XI system (French:"Système An XI", after of the 11th year of the French Republic, i.e. 1803) was a French artillery system developed during the rule of Napoleon. The Year XI system was original in that it brought various improvements to the highly successful Gribeauval system, on which many successes of the Napoleonic Wars relied. It especially consisted in streamlining the existing Gribeauval designs. The main proponent of the new system was General Marmont.  It was superseded by the Valée system.

Definition
In light of the French Revolutionary Wars it appeared especially that the Gribeauval 4-pdr was too light, and that the 8-pdr was too heavy for medium field artillery. These two guns had not appeared adequate against enemy 6-pdr guns.

In order to define the new improved system, Napoleon formed a committee of Artillery on 29 December 1801, presided by general Augustin Gabriel d'Aboville, First Inspector of Artillery. The committee accomplished its research from 11 January 1802 to 21 July 1802. Napoleon himself participated in the proceedings:

The committee gave its results on 2 May 1803.

One of the main findings of the committee was as follows:
 To recommend the introduction of a 6-pdr and the suppression of the 4-pdr and the 8-pdr.
 The field artillery would thus be composed of a 12-pdr cannon, a 6-pdr cannon and a 24-pdr (5.72-inch) howitzer
 The mountain artillery would have the short 3-pdr cannon, short 6-pdr cannon and 24-pdr howitzer.
 Siege artillery was also modified, with the introduction of new Long 24-pdr and Short 24-pdr,
 Garrison artillery was also modified, with the introduction of new Long 24-pdr, Long 12-pdr and Long 6-pdr cannons
 New Mortars as well as 324mm, 216mm and 152mm mortars, and 405mm perriers.

Obsolescence

The Year XI system would be further improved with the Valée system in 1828.

See also

Notes

References 

 Dawson, A.L., Dawson P.L. and Summerfield S. (2007) Napoleonic Artillery, Crowood Press, 
 Smith, Digby (trans) (2011) "The Austrian Cavalry Gun in Comparison to the Horse Artillery of Other States by Smola in 1827," Smoothbore Ordnance Journal, Issue 1, Ken Trotman Publishing, 

Artillery of France
Artillery of the Napoleonic Wars